Carrie Glacier is located on Mount Carrie and Mount Fairchild in the Olympic Mountains of Olympic National Park. Part of the Carrie Glacier plunges over the steep rockwall, contributing ice to an adjacent glacier, while the other section flows north-northeast, avoiding the precipitous drop. This segment of ice is confined by an arête to the west and Mount Fairchild to the east in a chute. The glacier reaches as low as  before terminating. There are several other patches of snow and glaciers located nearby, such as the Fairchild Glacier.

Mount Carrie and Carrie Glacier were named by surveyor Theodore Rixon for his fiancée Caroline Jones whom he met on a trail in Soleduck Valley.

See also
List of glaciers in the United States

References

Glaciers of Clallam County, Washington
Glaciers of the Olympic Mountains
Glaciers of Washington (state)